Syrna was a town of ancient Caria. According to Greek mythology Podalirius, son of Asclepius founded the place. He named it after the Carian princess Syrna, daughter of Damaethus, whom he married her after he first healed her from a serious injury.
 
Its site is located near Bayır, Asiatic Turkey.

References

Populated places in ancient Caria
Former populated places in Turkey
Marmaris District
History of Muğla Province